The 2008–09 Atlantic Coast Conference men's basketball season was the 56th season for the league. North Carolina won the regular season crown while Duke won the ACC Tournament championship. The season saw Tyler Hansbrough set conference records in points (finishing with 2,872 for his career) and free throws made (982), while Miami's Jack McClinton ended his career as the conference's all time three-point marksman (.440 3-point FG%).

Pre-season 
On October 26, for the second-straight year North Carolina was the unanimous choice to finish first atop the Atlantic Coast Conference basketball race in voting by 40 media members at the league's annual Basketball Media Day. Duke was picked for second, while Wake Forest was voted third. Miami was fourth, followed by Clemson (fifth) and Virginia Tech (sixth).

Tyler Hansbrough was selected as pre-season ACC Player of the Year. Hansbrough averaged 22.6 points and 10.2 rebounds during the 2008–09 while earning first-team All-America honors for a third-straight year and consensus National Player of the Year honors. Wake Forest's Al-Farouq Aminu was the media's choice for the ACC pre-season Rookie of the Year.

Hansbrough and Boston College's Tyrese Rice were unanimous selections for the pre-season All-ACC team. Also named to the pre-season team were Miami's Jack McClinton, North Carolina's Ty Lawson and Gerald Henderson from Duke.

On November 13, the Los Angeles Athletic Club released their annual pre-season John R. Wooden Award watch list. The list is composed of 50 student athletes who, based on 2007-08's individual performance and team records, are the early frontrunners for college basketball's most coveted trophy. These top 50 candidates are returning players. Transfers, freshmen, and medical red-shirts are not eligible for this preseason list, but will be evaluated and considered for both the Midseason Top 30 list and the National Ballot. The ACC was represented by Boston College's Tyrese Rice, Duke's Gerald Henderson and Kyle Singler, Miami's Jack McClinton, North Carolina's Tyler Hansbrough, Wayne Ellington and Ty Lawson and Wake Forest's James Johnson. In the 2007–08 season, North Carolina's Hansbrough became the 12th ACC Player to earn Wooden National Player of the Year Award.

Regular season 
November
In November, nine ACC teams participated in eight regular season tournaments across the United States. Four ACC teams claimed championships.

On November 11, Duke's Mike Krzyzewski moved into fifth place on the NCAA's all-time win list with his 805th career victory, a 97–54 win over Georgia Southern. On November 16, Virginia's Sylven Landesberg has 28 points, eight rebounds and eight assists as the Cavaliers beat VMI 107- 97. Landesberg's 28 points tied the second-highest total by an ACC freshman in his college debut. On November 21, With Maryland's 89–74 overtime win over Vermont, Gary Williams became only the third coach in league history to reach 400 career victories while coaching in the ACC. On November 21, Virginia's Sylven Landesberg netted a game-high 22 points in the Cavaliers' 68–66 win over Radford and became only the second freshman in ACC history to score 20 points in each of his first three games. Georgia Tech's Kenny Anderson scored 20 or more points in each of his first six games as a freshman in 1989–90. On November 30, Ty Lawson had 22 points as No. 1 North Carolina beat UNC-Asheville 116–48. The 68-point win margin was the largest in the ACC since a 75-point Maryland win over North Texas State (132–57) on Dec. 23, 1998, and tied for the seventh largest margin ever in ACC history.

December
On Wednesday, December 3, The ACC won its 10th-straight ACC–Big Ten Challenge by winning six of the eleven matchups. The series was highlighted by the 98–63 victory of No. 1 North Carolina over No. 12 Michigan State at Ford Field in what was dubbed as "Basketbowl II". On December 23, Boston College's Corey Raji was a perfect 12-for-12 from the field and scored a career-high 26 points in a 99–61 win over Maine. Raji's performance tied him for the second-best single game performance in ACC history. UNC's Brad Daugherty holds the ACC single-game field proficiency mark making all 13 of his shots versus UCLA back on Nov. 24, 1985. On December 30, NC State sophomore Tracy Smith came off the bench to score a career-high 31 points in the Wolfpack's 88–68 win over visiting Towson. Smith's 31 points set a school record and tied for the third-highest point total by a non-starter in ACC history.

January
On January 3, Jeff Teague had a game-high 30 points and James Johnson adds 22 points and 15 rebounds as sixth ranked Wake Forest snapped the nation's longest home court winning streak at 53 with a 94–87 win at BYU before a crowd of 26,096. On January 19, 16–0 Wake Forest took over the No. 1 spot in the AP poll and became the second ACC team to be ranked No. 1 in both the writers and coaches' polls. With the Deacons assuming the top spot in his 46th game as a head coach, Dino Gaudio became the third-fastest ACC head coach to have his team voted #1. On January 26, 18–1 Duke became the third ACC team this season to be ranked No. 1 in the AP poll, marking the second time in ACC annals and the fourth time in AP poll history that three different teams from the same conference have been ranked No. 1 in the same season. On January 31, In only the second-ever meeting between brothers in an ACC game, the Aminu brothers (Alade and Al-Farouq) combine for 27 points and 24 rebounds as Georgia Tech upsets No. 4 Wake Forest 76–74 in Atlanta. Al-Farouq had 17 points, 11 rebounds and five steals for the Deacons while Alade had 10 points, 13 rebounds for the Jackets.

February
On February 5, midway through the 2009 college basketball season, the Los Angeles Athletic Club's John R. Wooden Award Committee selected the top 30 candidates for the John R. Wooden Award, the nation's most coveted college basketball honor. The list is composed of the players who will compete for this season's player of the year award, the midseason list is based on individual player performance and team records during the first half of the season. The ACC was represent by North Carolina's Tyler Hansbrough, Ty Lawson, Duke's Gerald Henderson, Kyle Singler and Wake Forest's Jeff Teague. Teague was one of nine players who were selected for the midseason list who were not selected in the preseason.

On February 15, Ty Lawson had 21 points and four assists and Wayne Ellington added 15 points and 10 rebounds in North Carolina's 69–65 win at Miami. With the win, UNC's Roy Williams' became the winningest coach through his first 200 games
at an ACC school. On February 21, Greivis Vasquez posted Maryland's first triple-double since 1987 as the Terps overcame a 16-point second-half deficit to beat No. 3 North Carolina 88–85 in overtime, ending the Tar Heels' 10-game win streak. In posting Maryland's third ever triple double, Vasquez had a career-high 35 points, 11 rebounds and 10 assists. Vasquez's 35 points set a record for the most ever by an ACC player recording a triple-double.

On February 22, In North Carolina's 104–74 win over Georgia Tech, the Tar Heels' Tyler Hansbrough made all eight of his free throws and became the NCAA career leader in free throws made with 907. Hansbrough broke Wake Forest's Dickie Hemric's record set in 1955 with his 906th free throw with 14:54 to play in the second half.

March
On March 7, Miami's Jack McClinton was a perfect 16-for-16 from the free throw line and scored a game-high 24 points as
the Hurricanes overcame a nine-point halftime deficit en route to a 72–64 win over visiting NC State. McClinton's 16-for-16 effort tied for the fourth-best single-game mark in league history.

Rankings

Statistics

Individual

Teams

Postseason

ACC Tournament 

The third-seeded Duke Blue Devils defeated fourth-seeded Florida State 79–69 in the title ACC Championship game on Sunday, March 15, giving Duke its ninth ACC crown in 12 years. Duke also tied North Carolina for most tournament championships with 17. Duke's Jon Scheyer was named the tournament MVP.

NCAA Tournament 

Ty Lawson was the South regional MVP and he was joined on the All-regional team by teammates Danny Green and Tyler Hansbrough.

The first-seeded North Carolina Tarheels defeated third-seeded Michigan State 89–72 in the title NCAA Championship game on Monday, April 6, giving North Carolina its second NCAA crown in four years. It was North Carolina's fifth national championship. North Carolina's Wayne Ellington was named the Final Four's Most Outstanding Player.

National Invitation Tournament

Conference awards and honors

Weekly awards 
ACC Players of the Week
Throughout the conference season, the ACC offices name a player and rookie of the week. The MVP of the ACC tournament is the automatic winner of the final ACC player of the week of each season.

Season awards 
Player of the Year

 Ty Lawson – North Carolina

Rookie of the Year
 Sylven Landesberg – Virginia

Coach of the Year
 Leonard Hamilton – Florida State

Defensive Player of the Year
 Toney Douglas – Florida State

All-Atlantic Coast Conference

First Team
 Tyler Hansbrough1 – North Carolina
 Toney Douglas – Florida State
 Ty Lawson – North Carolina
 Gerald Henderson – Duke
 Jack McClinton – Miami
1 – Denotes unanimous selection
Second Team
 Jeff Teague – Wake Forest
 Trevor Booker – Clemson
 Tyrese Rice – Boston College
 Kyle Singler – Duke
 Greivis Vasquez – Maryland
Third Team
 James Johnson – Wake Forest
 Malcolm Delaney – Virginia Tech
 A. D. Vassallo – Virginia Tech
 Danny Green – North Carolina
 Gani Lawal – Georgia Tech

Honorable Mention: Wayne Ellington – North Carolina, K.C. Rivers – Clemson, Sylven Landesberg – Virginia

All-ACC Freshman team
 Sylven Landesberg1 – Virginia
 Al-Farouq Aminu1 – Wake Forest
 Iman Shumpert – Georgia Tech
 Solomon Alabi – Florida State
 Ed Davis – North Carolina
1 – Denotes unanimous selection
Honorable Mention: Chris Singleton – Florida State

All-ACC Defensive team
 Trevor Booker – Clemson
 Toney Douglas – Florida State
 Solomon Alabi – Florida State
 Danny Green – North Carolina
 L. D. Williams – Wake Forest
Honorable Mention: Ty Lawson – North Carolina, Gani Lawal – Georgia Tech, Courtney Fells – NC State, Gerald Henderson – Duke

All-ACC Academic team
To be eligible for consideration, a student-athlete must have earned a 3.00 grade point average for the previous semester and maintained a 3.00 cumulative average during his academic career. Four players – McClinton, Paulus, Duke's Brian Zoubek and Virginia's Jerome Meyinsse – are repeaters from previous league all-academic teams. McClinton and Paulus were named to the team for the third time in their careers, while Zoubek and Meyinsse are two-time selections.

National awards and honors

NABC 
On March 5, the National Association of Basketball Coaches announced their Division I All‐District teams, recognizing the nation's best men's collegiate basketball student-athletes. Selected and voted on by member coaches of the NABC, 240 student-athletes, from 24 districts were chosen. The selection on this list are then eligible for the State Farm Coaches' Division I All-America teams to be announced at the 2009 NABC Convention in Detroit. The following list represents the ACC players chosen to the list. All ACC schools are within District 2.

First Team
 Tyler Hansbrough – North Carolina
 Jeff Teague – Wake Forest
 Toney Douglas – Florida State
 Jack McClinton – Miami
 Ty Lawson – North Carolina
Second Team
 Tyrese Rice – Boston College
 Gerald Henderson – Duke
 Trevor Booker – Clemson
 Kyle Singler – Duke
 A. D. Vassallo – Virginia Tech

USBWA 
On March 10, the U.S. Basketball Writers Association released its 2008–09 Men's All-District Teams, based on voting from its national membership. There are nine regions from coast to coast and a player and coach of the year are selected in each. The following is each ACC player selected within their respective regions.

District I (ME, VT, NH, RI, MA, CT)
All-District Team
 Tyrese Rice, Boston College
 Joe Trapani, Boston College
District III (VA, NC, SC, MD)
Player of the Year
 Ty Lawson, North Carolina
Coach of the Year
 Oliver Purnell, Clemson
All-District Team
 Trevor Booker, Clemson
 Tyler Hansbrough, North Carolina
 Gerald Henderson, Duke
 Ty Lawson, North Carolina
 Kyle Singler, Duke
 Jeff Teague, Wake
 Greivis Vasquez, Maryland
District IV (KY, TN MS, AL, GA, FL)
All-District Team
 Toney Douglas, Florida State

CoSIDA 
On February 5, 2009, the College Sports Information Directors of America (CoSIDA) and ESPN The Magazine selected their Academic All-Americans from throughout college basketball. To be nominated, a student-athlete must be a starter or important reserve with at least a 3.30 cumulative grade point average (on a 4.0 scale) at his/her current institution. Nominated athletes must have participated in at least 50 percent of the team's games at the position listed on the nomination form (where applicable). No student-athlete is eligible until he has completed one full calendar year at his current institution and has reached sophomore athletic eligibility. In the cases of transfers, graduate students and two-year college graduates, the student-athlete must have completed one full calendar year at the nominating institution to be eligible. Nominees in graduate school must have a cumulative GPA of 3.30 or better both as an undergrad and in grad school. The ACC had two players selected from District III as first-team Academic All-District selections: Greg Paulus and Brian Zoubek, both from Duke. Greg Paulus was also selected overall by the CoSIDA as a third-team Academic All-American.

All-American 

To earn "consensus" status, a player must win honors from a majority of the following teams: the
Associated Press, the USBWA, The Sporting News and the National Association of Basketball Coaches.

References